New Bright (officially New Bright Industrial Co., Ltd.) is an American toy manufacturer specializing primarily in radio-controlled vehicles headquartered in Wixom, Michigan.

History
New Bright was founded in 1955 and was originally known for its battery-operated and later radio-controlled toy trains sold at department stores for Christmas. Trains such as these are still traditionally sold and New Bright has since introduced other radio-controlled toy types such as cars, boats, and toy robots developed with iRobot.

Products
New Bright sells radio-controlled licensed sports cars, monster trucks, ATVs, and speedboats including Forza Motorsport-themed Bugatti and Chevrolet cars and two RC vehicles (Jeep Wrangler Trailcat concept and Ford Bronco racing truck) with mobile app-connected cameras marketed as DashCams, as well as unlicensed New Bright-branded products, including monster trucks, drag racers, dune buggies, Christmas-exclusive trains, and radio-controlled wheeled insects and spiders. Aside from RC vehicles, New Bright also sells a small number of non-remote-controlled free-rolling toy construction vehicles, car carrier trucks, and monster trucks.

Licensed products
Licensed RC vehicles currently sold by New Bright include:

Monster trucks

 Bigfoot
 Chevrolet K5 Blazer
 Chevrolet Silverado
 Ford Bronco
 Ford Bronco Sport
 Ford F-150
 Ford F-150 Lightning
 Ford F-150 Raptor
 Ford Super Duty
 GMC Hummer EV
 Jeep Gladiator
 Jeep Wrangler
 Ram 1500

Sports cars

 Bugatti Chiron
 Chevrolet Camaro
 Chevrolet Corvette C7
 Chevrolet Corvette C8
 Dodge Challenger
 Ferrari FXX-K
 Ferrari LaFerrari
 Ford Mustang
 Ford Mustang Mach-E
 Ford Mustang Shelby GT500

Other

 Funco F9 (dune buggy)
 MasterCraft X-23 (speedboat)
 Polaris RZR (ATV)

References

Model manufacturers of the United States
Companies based in Michigan
American companies established in 1955
Privately held companies based in Michigan
Manufacturing companies based in Michigan
Radio-controlled car manufacturers
Toy cars and trucks